Vernon Weddle Jr. (born August 23, 1935) is an American film, stage and television actor. He is perhaps best known for playing "General Washburne" in the 1986 film Short Circuit.

Life and career 
Weddle was born in Hattiesburg, Mississippi, the son of Vernon Sr. and Grace. When he was thirteen years old, Weddle and his family moved to Texas, where he has attended at Lon Morris College and University of Texas, in 1958. He then attended at Stephens College, where he was a resident actor and instructor for theatre arts.

Weddle began his career with a stage play, with his wife, Gerri. In the play, he played the role of an exhausted psychologist, with Tom Ewell as the lead in the play. The play was shown at the Okoboji Summer Theatre. Later in his career, Weddle began appearing in film and television programs, where he first appeared on the television series Mr. Deeds Goes to Town, playing Brad Kingsley. He also appeared in Bonanza, playing South, in 1969. He continued his career, mainly appearing in film and television programs.

Weddle appeared in numerous television programs including Barney Miller, The Mary Tyler Moore Show, Three's Company (and its spin-off The Ropers), Archie Bunker's Place, The Mod Squad, Sanford and Son, Buck Rogers in the 25th Century, Hill Street Blues, The Jeffersons, The Rockford Files, Trapper John, M.D., The Dukes of Hazzard and Lou Grant. He also appeared in television soap operas, such as, General Hospital, Dynasty, Knots Landing, Dallas, Hotel, The Colbys, Filthy Rich and Days of Our Lives, playing Bruce Fischell. Weddle appeared and co-starred in films such as The Parallax View, Oh, God! Book II, The Devil and Max Devlin, Norma Rae, Carbon Copy, Harry's War, Jacqueline Bouvier Kennedy, and Endangered Species. He also appeared in the television film Betrayal, where he played the role of the "Savings Officer". Weddle retired his career in 1990.

Personal life 
Weddle met his wife, Gerri at the Lon Morris College, where they both shared the same bill on the musical Roberta. They later married and had two sons, Kirk and Richard.

References

External links 

Rotten Tomatoes profile

1935 births
Living people
People from Hattiesburg, Mississippi
Male actors from Mississippi
American male film actors
American male television actors
American male stage actors
American male soap opera actors
20th-century American male actors
University of Texas alumni
Lon Morris College alumni